This is a list of association football clubs located in Angola. 
For a complete list, see :Category:Football clubs in Angola

#
4 de Abril

A
Academia de Futebol de Angola
Académica do Lobito
Académica do Soyo
ASA
ASK Dragão
Atlético de Luanda
Atlético do Namibe

B
Benfica de Luanda
Benfica do Huambo
Benfica do Lubango
Bravos Do Maquis
Brilhantes da Kissama

C
Construtores do Uíge
Cuando Cubango FC

D
Desportivo da EKA
Desportivo da Huíla
Desportivo do Bengo
Domant FC

E
Esperança do Congo
Evale FC

F
Futebol Clube de Cabinda
Futebol Clube de Luanda
Futebol Clube do Moxico
Ferroviário da Huíla
Ferroviário do Huambo

H

I
Independente Sport Clube
Inter da Huíla
Interclube

J
Jackson Garcia
Juventude do Moxico

K
Kabuscorp

M
Malanje Sport Clube
Mpatu a Ponta

N
Nacional de Benguela
Norberto de Castro

P
Petro de Luanda
Petro do Huambo
Polivalentes FC
Porcelana FC
Primeiro de Agosto
Primeiro de Maio
Progresso da Lunda Sul
Progresso do Sambizanga

R
Real M'buco
Recreativo da Caála
Recreativo do Libolo
Recreativo do Seles
Renascimento

S
Sagrada Esperança
Santa Rita de Cássia
Santos FC
Saurimo FC
Sporting de Benguela
Sporting de Cabinda
Sporting do Bié

U
União do Uíge

See also
 Girabola
 Gira Angola

External links
National Football Teams

Angola
Football

Football clubs